A Loud Call is the third studio album by Australian indie-folk artist Holly Throsby. It was released on 14 July 2008, which peaked at No. 34 on the ARIA Albums Chart. Throsby worked with Nashville-based producer, Mark Nevers (Lambchop, Andrew Bird). At the ARIA Music Awards of 2008 she was nominated for Best Female Artist for the album.

Background 

Most of A Loud Call, the third studio album by Australian indie folk singer-songwriter, Holly Throsby, was recorded at Beech House Studios, the residence of producer Mark Nevers, in South Nashville, United States. Nevers had previously produced material for Lambchop and Andrew Bird. Some additional recording of strings and horns was done at Tony Dupé's home studio in Kangaroo Valley, New South Wales.

A Loud Call was Radio National's album of the week when it was released on 14 July 2008. The album peaked at No. 34 on the ARIA Albums Chart. In September 2008, Throsby was nominated for Best Female Artist at the ARIA Music Awards of 2008 for the album.

Track listing

Personnel 

Credits:

Musicians
 Holly Throsby – guitars (acoustic, electric), keyboards, piano, lead vocals
 Bonnie "Prince" Billy – backing vocals, co-lead vocals ("Would You?")
 Jena Birchell – cello, bass guitar, mandolin
 Tony Crow – synthesiser, backing vocals
 Tony Dupé – clarinet, bass clarinet, French Horn, guitar, horn arrangements, piano, string arrangements, backing vocals
 Penny McBride – flugelhorn, trumpet, backing vocals
 Mark Nevers – guitar, backing vocals
 Matt Swanson – bass guitar, backing vocals
 Gary Tussing – cello
 William Tyler – electric guitar, backing vocals
 Bree van Reyk – drums, organ, accordion

Production details
 Jim DeMain – mastering engineer
 Tony Dupé – engineer
 Mark Nevers – audio engineer, audio production, engineer, mixing engineer
 Tim Whitten – mixing engineer

Charts

References 

2008 albums
Holly Throsby albums